This a list of television programs that were later adapted into feature films.

Programs with films which are prequels, sequels or based upon the series

Pilot episodes released as feature films
Television pilots that were soon or later adapted into feature films for either a release or re-release to movie theaters or direct-to-video.
77 Sunset Strip (Pilot, Girl on the Run, 1958, initially briefly shown as a "feature film" in one Caribbean theater in order for the studio to cheat Roy Huggins of television series creator rights)
The Adventures of Jimmy Neutron: Boy Genius (Original unaired TV pilot, "Runaway Rocketboy", 1998, expanded and remade into a feature film as Jimmy Neutron: Boy Genius, 2001) 
The Amazing Spider-Man (Spider-Man, 1977)
Battlestar Galactica (Three-part TV pilot, "Saga of a Star World", re-edited into a big screen release in 1978 in the UK and international territories, in order to recoup its high production costs, and in the US in 1979 after the series' original cancellation that same year)
Buck Rogers in the 25th Century (1979, TV pilot released theatrically as a standalone film when no networks picked it up)
Buzz Lightyear of Star Command: The Adventure Begins (2000)
Gargoyles (Gargoyles the Movie: The Heroes Awaken, 1995)
House of Mouse (Mickey's Magical Christmas: Snowed in at the House of Mouse, 2001, were the series finale and Mickey's House of Villains, 2002, the pilot respectively)
Lilo & Stitch: The Series (Stitch! The Movie, 2003, and Leroy & Stitch, 2006, were the pilot and series finale to the series respectively)
Mighty Ducks: The Animated Series (Mighty Ducks the Movie: The First Face-Off, 1997)
The New Addams Family (Addams Family Reunion, 1998)
The Road Runner Show (Original TV pilot, Adventures of the Road Runner, 1962, released as a featurette five years before the series was picked up)
Star Wars: The Clone Wars (2008)
TaleSpin (Plunder & Lightning, 1990)
Temple Houston (The Man from Galveston, 1963)
The Three Musketeers (Knights of the Queen, 1954)
Turbo: A Power Rangers Movie (1997, took place between Power Rangers Zeo and Power Rangers Turbo)
Twin Peaks (1990, TV pilot released as a film in Europe)
The Untouchables (TV pilot edited into film for theatrical release as The Scarface Mob, 1962)
Many other series have released pilots or edited multi-part episodes as films overseas, including The Greatest American Hero and The X-Files.

Failed pilots
Some feature films began as a pilot episode for a TV series that was not picked up by any networks.
Atlantis: Milo's Return (direct-to-video, 2003)
Band of the Hand (1986)
Body Bags (TV, 1993)
Belle's Magical World (direct-to-video, 1998)
Chamber of Horrors (1966)
Cruel Intentions 2 (direct-to-video, 2001)
Hell Ship Mutiny (1957)
Lum and Abner Abroad (1956)
Mulholland Drive (2001)
Nightmares (1983)
Ride the High Iron (1956)
Sabu and the Magic Ring (1957)
Shoot Out at Big Sag (1962)
Tales of Robin Hood (1951)
Tarzan and the Trappers (1958)
Tex and the Lord of the Deep (1985)
Wolfshead: The Legend of Robin Hood (1973)
Ultraman: The Adventure Begins (1987)
Many failed pilots have been aired as television films; see Category:Television pilots not picked up as a series.

Television films
The following are television films that never saw theatrical release.

Before main run of show
Some television films have functioned as pilots or backdoor pilots for a subsequent TV series.
21 Jump Street (1987)
Alias Smith and Jones (1971)
All Grown Up! (started off as a one-hour TV movie in 2001, coinciding with Rugrats''' 10th anniversary before being spun off into its own series two years later)Airwolf (Shadow of the Hawke, 1984)American Dad! (short film pilot episode, Inside the CIA, 2005)The A-Team (Mexican Slayride, 1983)Automan (1983)Banacek (Banacek: Detour to Nowhere, 1972)Big Hawaii (Danger in Paradise, 1977)Brand New Life: The Honeymooners (1989)The Brady Kids (The Brady Kids on Mysterious Island, 1972)Cagney & Lacey (1981)Cannon (1971)ChalkZone (The Big Blow-Up, 2004)Charlie's Angels (1976)Chase (1973)Chicago Story (1981)Chip 'n Dale Rescue Rangers (Rescue Rangers: To the Rescue, 1989)Code of Vengeance (Code of Vengeance, 1985, and Dalton: Code of Vengeance II, 1986)Columbo (Prescription: Murder, 1968, and Ransom for a Dead Man, 1971)The D.A. (Murder One, 1969, and Conspiracy to Kill, 1971) Darkwing Duck (Darkly Dawns the Duck, 1991)The Delphi Bureau (The Merchant of Death Assignment, 1972)Dog and Cat (1977)DuckTales (Treasure of the Golden Suns, 1987)Ellery Queen (Too Many Suspects, 1975)The Family Holvak (The Greatest Gift, 1974)Fantasy Island (Fantasy Island, 1977, and Return to Fantasy Island, 1978)Firehouse (Pilot first aired in 1973, a year before the series debuted in 1974)Foster's Home for Imaginary Friends (House of Bloo's, 2004)Gemini Man (Code Name Minus One, 1976)Get Christie Love! (1974)Gibbsville (The Turning Point of Jim Malloy, 1975)Griff (Man on the Outside, the pilot which was supposed to proceed the series, actually aired two years after the series' cancellation in 1975)Gun Shy (Tales of the Apple Dumpling Gang, 1982)Harry O (Such Dust as Dreams Are Made On, 1973 and Smile Jenny, You're Dead, 1974)
 Hart to Hart (1979)Hec Ramsey (The Century Turns, 1972)Hercules: The Legendary Journeys (Hercules and the Amazon Women, Hercules and the Lost Kingdom, Hercules and the Circle of Fire, Hercules in the Underworld, and Hercules in the Maze of the Minotaur, all 1994)Hey Arnold! (short film pilot episode, 24 Hours to Live, 1996)How the West Was Won (The Macahans, 1976)Hunter (1984)The Immortal (1969)The Incredible Hulk (The Incredible Hulk and The Return of the Incredible Hulk, both 1977)The Invisible Man (1975)Iron Horse (Scalplock, 1966)Ironside (1967)Jigsaw (Man on the Move, 1972)Justice League (Justice League: Secret Origins, 2001)Kiteretsu Daihyakka (Fujiko Fujio no Kiteretsu Daihyakka, 1987)Knight Rider (Knight of the Phoenix, 1982)Knight Rider (2008)Kobo, the Li'l Rascal (Kobo-chan Special: Filled with Autumn!!, 1990, and Kobo-chan Special: Filled with Dreams!!, 1991)Kojak (The Marcus-Nelson Murders, 1973) Kolchak: The Night Stalker (The Night Stalker, 1972, and The Night Strangler, 1973)Kung Fu (The Way of the Tiger, The Sign of the Dragon, 1972)L.A. Law (1986)Lassie's Rescue Rangers (Lassie and the Spirit of Thunder Mountain, 1972)The Lion Guard (The Lion Guard: Return of the Roar, 2016)Little House on the Prairie (1974)Logan's Run (1977)Lois & Clark: The New Adventures of Superman ("Pilot", 1993)Longstreet (1971) The Love Boat (The Love Boat, 1976, and The Love Boat II and The New Love Boat, both 1977)The MacKenzies of Paradise Cove (Stickin' Together, 1978)Magnum, P.I. (Don't Eat the Snow in Hawaii, 1980)Man from Atlantis (Man from Atlantis, The Death Scouts, Killer Spores, and The Disappearances, all 1977)Manimal (1983)M.A.N.T.I.S. (1994)Marcus Welby, M.D. (A Matter of Humanities, 1969)Matt Helm (1975)McCloud (McCloud: Who Killed Miss U.S.A.?, 1970)McMillan & Wife (Once Upon a Dead Man, 1971)Mickey Spillane's Mike Hammer (Murder Me, Murder You, 1983, and More Than Murder, 1984, the third film, The Return of Mickey Spillane's Mike Hammer, 1986 launched the sequel series, The New Mike Hammer)The Mod Squad (The Teeth of the Barracuda, 1968)Murder, She Wrote (The Murder of Sherlock Holmes, 1984)The Naked Brothers Band (The Naked Brothers Band: The Movie, 2005)Nakia (1974)The New Adventures of Flash Gordon (Originally conceived and produced as an animated made-for-TV movie, under the title Flash Gordon: The Greatest Adventure of All, it was later reconfigured into an animated TV series. After the said TV cartoon show version of Flash Gordon ended in 1981, the originally intended feature-length animated film eventually made it to television in 1982.)The New Beachcombers (2002)Night Gallery (1969)Night Man (1997)Outlaws (1986)Petrocelli (Night Games, 1974)The Phoenix (1981)Police Story (Slow Boy, 1973)Quantum Leap (Genesis, 1989)Rapunzel's Tangled Adventure (Tangled: Before Ever After, 2017)Richie Brockelman, Private Eye (Richie Brockelman: The Missing 24 Hours, 1976)RoboCop (The Future of Law Enforcement, 1994)Robotech (Codename: Robotech, 1984)The Rockford Files (Backlash of the Hunter, 1974)The Rookies (1972)Samurai Jack (Samurai Jack: The Premiere Movie, 2001)Sarge (The Badge or the Cross, 1971)Search (Probe, 1972)Serpico (The Deadly Game, 1976)Simon & Simon (Pirate's Key, 1978)The Six Million Dollar Man (The Six Million Dollar Man, Wine, Women and War and The Solid Gold Kidnapping, all 1973)The Sixth Sense (Sweet, Sweet Rachel, 1971)The Snoop Sisters (The Female Instinct, 1972)Spenser: For Hire (Promised Land, 1985)Starsky & Hutch (1975)Street Hawk (1985)The Streets of San Francisco (1972)The Swiss Family Robinson (1975)Sword of Justice (A Double Life, 1978)Toma (1973)Transformers: Animated (Transform and Roll Out, 2007)Viper (1994)The Waltons (The Homecoming: A Christmas Story, 1971)Wonder Woman (The New Original Wonder Woman, 1975)Yogi's Gang (Yogi's Ark Lark, 1972)The Young Indiana Jones Chronicles (Young Indiana Jones and the Curse of the Jackal, 1992)The Young Pioneers (Young Pioneers and Young Pioneers' Christmas, both 1976)

Reunion films

Many American TV series have had TV films, usually filmed five or more years after the run of the original series, which reunite the cast of the series for a new plot. In some cases, there has been an entire string of such films, including for the detective shows Perry Mason (1957-1966; 30 films from 1985 to 1995), The Rockford Files, (1974–80; eight films from 1994 to 1999), and Hart to Hart (1979-1984; eight films from 1993 to 1996). In at least one case, with the 1988 Get Smart reunion film Get Smart, Again!, the success of the TV film eventually led to a brief 1995 revival of the series.

There have also been many television reunion specials, in which some or all of the original cast is brought together for interviews and clips.

Other
Television series that have had varying episodes, from sequels, double-length installments, multi-part storylines, and television specials based on their respective shows as films for miscellaneous purposes and alternative reasons.The Adventures of Jimmy Neutron: Boy Genius (The Jimmy Timmy Power Hour and Win, Lose and  Kaboom, both 2004, When Nerds Collide, 2005, and The Jerkinators, 2006)All Dogs Go to Heaven: The Series (An All Dogs Christmas Carol, 1998)Archie's Weird Mysteries (The Archies in Jugman, 2002)As Told by Ginger (Summer of Camp Caprice, 2002, Far from Home, 2003, and Butterflies Are Free and The Wedding Frame, both 2004)Arthur (Arthur's Perfect Christmas, 2000, Arthur, It's Only Rock 'n' Roll, 2002, D.W. and the Beastly Birthday and Arthur and the Haunted Tree House, both 2017, The Rhythm and Roots of Arthur and An Arthur Thanksgiving, both 2020, Arthur's First Day, 2021)Avatar: The Last Airbender (Sozin's Comet, 2008)The Banana Splits Adventure Hour (The Banana Splits in Hocus Pocus Park, 1972)The Beachcombers (A Beachcombers Christmas, 2004)Ben 10 (Ben 10 vs. The Negative 10, 2008)Bewitched (Tabitha and Adam and the Clown Family, 1972)Big Time Rush (Big Time Movie, 2012)
 Call of the Wild (Pilot, 2000)Camp Lazlo (Where's Lazlo?, 2007)Captain Future (Captain Future: The Great Race in the Solar System, 1978)Care Bears (Care Bears Nutcracker Suite, 1988)Case Closed (The Disappearance of Conan Edogawa: His History's Worst Two Days, 2014, and Episode One: The Great Detective Turned Small, 2016)CatDog (CatDog and the Great Parent Mystery, 2000)City Hunter (The Secret Service, 1996,  Goodbye My Sweetheart, 1997, and Death of the Vicious Criminal Ryo Saeba, 1999)Codename: Kids Next Door (Operation I.N.T.E.R.V.I.E.W.S., 2008)Columbo (1990-2003)Death Note (Death Note: Relight - Visions of a God, 2007, and Death Note: Relight 2 - L's Successors, 2008)Dennis the Menace (Dennis the Menace: Cruise Control, 2002)Dexter's Laboratory (Dexter's Laboratory: Ego Trip, 1999)Digimon (Digital Monster X-Evolution, 2005)Dragon Ball GT (A Hero's Legacy, 1997)Dragon Ball Z (Bardock – The Father of Goku, 1990, and The History of Trunks, 1993)Drake & Josh (Really Big Shrimp, 2007)DuckTales (Catch as Cash Can, 1987, Time Is Money, 1988, and Super DuckTales, 1989)The Facts of Life  (The Facts of Life Goes to Paris, 1982, and The Facts of Life Down Under, 1987) The Fairly OddParents (Abra-Catastrophe!, 2003, Channel Chasers, 2004, School's Out! The Musical, 2004, Fairy Idol, 2006, Fairly OddBaby, 2008, and Wishology, 2009)Family Ties (Family Ties Vacation, 1985)The Famous Jett Jackson (Jett Jackson: The Movie, 2001)The File of Young Kindaichi (The Last Opera House Murders and Vampire Legend Murder Case, 2007)Flight 29 Down (The Hotel Tango, 2007)The Flintstones (A Flintstone Christmas, 1977, The Flintstones: Little Big League, 1978, The Flintstones Meet Rockula and Frankenstone, 1979, I Yabba-Dabba Do! and Hollyrock-a-Bye Baby, both 1993, and A Flintstones Christmas Carol, 1994)Foster's Home for Imaginary Friends (Good Wilt Hunting, 2005)Galaxy Express 999 (Can You Live Like a Warrior!!, 1979, and Emeraldes the Eternal Wanderer and Can You Love Like a Mother!!, both 1980) Goof Troop (Goof Troop Christmas: Have Yourself a Goofy Little Christmas, 1992)The Grim Adventures of Billy & Mandy (Billy & Mandy: Wrath of the Spider Queen, 2007, and Underfist: Halloween Bash, 2008)Groovie Goolies (Daffy Duck and Porky Pig Meet the Groovie Goolies, 1972)Hajime no Ippo (Hajime no Ippo - Champion Road, 2003) The Huckleberry Hound Show (The Good, the Bad, and Huckleberry Hound, 1988)iCarly (iGo to Japan, 2008)Ikkyū-san (Ikkyū-san: Ōabare no Yancha-hime, 1980)The Incredible Hulk (Bride of the Incredible Hulk, 1978)Inspector Gadget (Inspector Gadget's Last Case, 2002, and Inspector Gadget's Biggest Caper Ever, 2005)Kenan & Kel (Two Heads Are Better Than None, 2000)Kim Possible (Kim Possible: A Sitch in Time, 2002, and Kim Possible Movie: So the Drama, 2005)Kimba the White Lion (Jungle Emperor Leo: The Brave Changes the Future, 2009)Kinnikuman (Showdown! The 7 Justice Supermen vs. The Space Samurais, 1984)Knight Rider (Knight Rider 2000, 1991, and Knight Rider 2010, 1994)The Life and Times of Grizzly Adams (The Capture of Grizzly Adams, 1982)Little House on the Prairie (Look Back at Yesterday, 1983, and The Last Farewell and Bless All the Dear Children, both 1984)The Littles (Liberty and the Littles, 1986)The Lone Ranger (The Lone Ranger Story, 1955)Lupin III (1989–present)Madeline (My Fair Madeline, 2002)Maison Ikkoku (Maison Ikkoku: The Final Chapter, 1988)Mickey Spillane's Mike Hammer  (Mike Hammer: Murder Takes All, 1989, was the final installment of the Stacy Keach television series) My Gym Partner's a Monkey (The Big Field Trip, 2007, and Animal School Musical, 2008) My Life as a Teenage Robot (Escape from Cluster Prime, 2005)The Naked Brothers Band (Battle of the Bands, 2007, Sidekicks, Polar Bears, Mystery Girl and Operation Mojo, all 2008, Naked Idol and The Premiere, both 2009)Ned's Declassified School Survival Guide (Ned's Guide to: Field Trips, Permission Slips, Signs and Weasels, 2007)
 Oishinbo (Oishinbo: Kyūkyoku Tai Shikō, Chōju Ryōri Taiketsu!!, 1992, and Oishinbo: Nichibei Kome Sensō, 1993)One Piece (2000–present)Peanuts (A Charlie Brown Celebration, 1982, It's an Adventure, Charlie Brown, 1983, You're a Good Man, Charlie Brown, 1985, and Snoopy! The Musical and It's the Girl in the Red Truck, Charlie Brown, both 1988)Pokémon (Mewtwo Returns, 2000, and The Mastermind of Mirage Pokemon, 2006)Police Story (A Cry for Justice, 1979, Confessions of a Lady Cop, 1980, and The Freeway Killings, 1987)Popeye the Sailor (Popeye Meets the Man Who Hated Laughter, 1972)Rocket Power (Race Across New Zealand, 2002, Reggie's Big (Beach) Break, 2003, and Island of the Menehune, 2004)Rugrats (Tales from the Crib: Snow White, 2005 and Tales from the Crib: Three Jacks and a Beanstalk, 2006)
 Samurai Jack (The Premiere Movie, 2001)Sabrina: The Animated Series and Sabrina's Secret Life (Sabrina: Friends Forever, 2002)Sabrina the Teenage Witch (Sabrina Goes to Rome, 1998, and Sabrina Down Under, 1999)Sally the Witch (Mahoutsukai Sally: Majo ni Natta Yoshiko-chan and Mahoutsukai Sally: Haha no Ai wa Towa ni! Aurora no Tani ni Kodamasuru Kanashimi no Majo no Sakebi!, both 1990)Scooby-Doo (Scooby Goes Hollywood, 1979)Soreike! Anpanman (Let's Go! Anpanman: Scoop the South Sea!, 1990, and Soreike! Anpanman: Kieta Jam Oji-san, 2000)Space Battleship Yamato (Yamato: The New Voyage, 1979)SpongeBob SquarePants (SpongeBob's Atlantis SquarePantis, 2007, and SpongeBob's Truth or Square, 2009)Star vs. the Forces of Evil (The Battle for Mewni, 2017)Star Wars: Droids (The Great Heep, 1986)Stitch! (Stitch and the Planet of Sand, 2012, and Stitch! Perfect Memory, 2015)
 Strange Days at Blake Holsey High (Conclusions, 2006)The Suite Life of Zack & Cody (The Suite Life Goes Hollywood, 2007)The Sullivans (The John Sullivan Story, 1979)Superman: The Animated Series (The Batman Superman Movie: World's Finest, 1997)Teenage Mutant Ninja Turtles (1987-1996) (Planet of the Turtleoids, 1991)Teenage Mutant Ninja Turtles (2003-2009) (Turtles Forever, 2009)Tenjho Tenge (Tenjho Tenge: The Past Chapter, 2005)Top Cat (Top Cat and the Beverly Hills Cats, 1988)Touch (Touch: Miss Lonely Yesterday, 1998, and Touch: Cross Road, 2001)The Twilight Zone  (Twilight Zone: Rod Serling's Lost Classics, 1994)Unfabulous (Unfabulous: The Perfect Moment, 2006)Urusei Yatsura (Urusei Yatsura: Jump Out, It's Spring!, 1982)Voltron (Voltron: Fleet of Doom, 1986)The Wild Thornberrys (The Origin of Donnie, 2001)Wizards of Waverly Place (The Wizards Return: Alex vs. Alex, 2014)Xavier Riddle and the Secret Museum (Xavier Riddle and the Secret Movie: I Am Madam President, 2020)Yawara! A Fashionable Judo Girl! (Yawara! Special - Zutto Kimi no Koto ga, 1996)The Yogi Bear Show (Yogi's First Christmas, 1980, Yogi's Great Escape, 1987, Yogi Bear and the Magical Flight of the Spruce Goose, 1987, Yogi and the Invasion of the Space Bears, 1988, and Yogi the Easter Bear, 1994)The Young Indiana Jones Chronicles (Young Indiana Jones and the Mystery of the Blues, Young Indiana Jones and the Scandal of 1920 and Young Indiana Jones and the Phantom Train of Doom, all 1993, Young Indiana Jones and the Hollywood Follies, 1994, Young Indiana Jones and the Treasure of the Peacock's Eye and Young Indiana Jones and the Attack of the Hawkmen, both 1995, and Young Indiana Jones: Travels with Father, 1996)

Programs re-edited for release as feature-length films

One or more episodes from the following television programs were edited together for release as a feature film. Some of the films add new material, and others do not.

Episodes released theatricallyThe 20th Century Fox Hour: The season one episode "Overnight Haul" was given a theatrical release in Australia as a standalone film.The All-New Pink Panther ShowCommando Cody: Sky Marshal of the UniverseDoctor Who: The 50th anniversary special, The Day of the Doctor (2013), and series 8 opener, Deep Breath (2014), were both shown in theatres alongside their premiere broadcast.Star Trek: The Next Generation: Six episodes were released in theaters to coincide with the high-definition release of the series on Blu-ray.Game of Thrones: The episodes "The Watchers on the Wall" and "The Children" were given a week-long IMAX release.Walt Disney anthology television series: Many select television films that aired in the anthology, including Guns in the Heather and The Omega Connection'', were adapted for theatrical release in international territories.

Films re-edited as episodes for a television program

See also
 List of films based on radio series
 List of films based on British television series
 List of television programs based on films

References

External links
Cinematical Seven: TV Spies That Made Terrible Movies
Cinematical Seven: TV Continued on the Big Screen

Films
Television programs
List
F
Lists of films and television series